Petzval field curvature, named for Joseph Petzval, describes the optical aberration in which a flat object normal to the optical axis (or a non-flat object past the hyperfocal distance) cannot be brought properly into focus on a flat image plane. Field curvature can be corrected with the use of a field flattener, designs can also incorporate a curved focal plane like in the case of the human eye in order to improve image quality at the focal surface.

It is not to be confused with flat-field correction, which refers to brightness uniformity.

Analysis

Consider an "ideal" single-element lens system for which all planar wave fronts are focused to a point at distance f from the lens. Placing this lens the distance f from a flat image sensor, image points near the optical axis will be in perfect focus, but rays off axis will come into focus before the image sensor, dropping off by the cosine of the angle they make with the optical axis. This is less of a problem when the imaging surface is spherical, as in the human eye.

Most current photographic lenses are designed to minimize field curvature, and so effectively have a focal length that increases with ray angle. Lenses of short focal lengths (ultra wide, wide and normal) below 50 mm typically suffer more from field curvature. Telephoto lenses typically have very little or no visible field curvature.  The Petzval lens is one design which has significant field curvature; images taken with the lens are very sharp in the centre, but at greater angles the image is out of focus. Film cameras, may be able to bend their image planes to compensate, particularly when the lens is fixed and known.  This also includes plate film, which could still be bent slightly.  Digital sensors are difficult to bend, although experimental products have been produced.  By 2016 the only consumer cameras featuring curved sensors were "selfie" Sony Cybershot KW-1 and KW-11. Large mosaics of sensors (necessary anyway due to limited chip sizes) can be shaped to simulate a bend over larger scales.

The Petzval field curvature is equal to the Petzval sum over an optical system,

where  is the radius of the  i th surface and the  n s are the indices of refraction on the first and second side of the surface.
Petzval curvature of a spherical mirror is double of its curvature and Petzval radius of a mirror is equal to its focal length.

Reduction of field curvature aberration
One method to reduce this aberration is to insert an aperture stop (iris) in order to remove edge light rays. This method, however, greatly decreases the light collecting power of the lens.

See also 
 Field flattener lens

References

Geometrical optics
Science of photography

de:Abbildungsfehler#Bildfeldwölbung